Looking Forward is the third and final studio album by Crosby, Stills, Nash & Young and their fifth, overall.  It is the fourteenth and final album when combined with releases by the trio of Crosby, Stills & Nash. It was released on Reprise Records in 1999 and peaked at number 26 on the Billboard 200, with total sales nearing 400,000.

Background and recording
Crosby, Stills & Nash toured extensively through the 1990s, playing almost as many shows as they had in the previous decades combined. Since their previous album, no new solo albums were forthcoming from Stephen Stills or Graham Nash, but David Crosby had discovered his adult son James Raymond, the two starting a band with Jeff Pevar yielding an album CPR in 1998. However, the band's relationship with Atlantic Records had soured, partly over a lack of push for After the Storm, but mostly over the perception that the label now had very little interest in the group when they had made the company millions during the 1970s heyday. They terminated their contract with Atlantic in 1997, and began to record CSN tracks out of pocket without a record deal. Working with Stills to compile the Buffalo Springfield retrospective box set, Neil Young became intrigued with these CSN sessions. Playing on some tracks in process, Young brought in three recordings he had earmarked for one of his own albums, "Looking Forward", "Slowpoke", and "Out of Control". The possibility of a new CSNY album attracted the attention of Young's label Reprise Records, which duly released the album once completed.

"Faith in Me" and "No Tears Left" were recorded in Ga Ga's Room in Los Angeles early on in the recording process. "Stand and Be Counted", "Seen Enough", "Dream for Him" and "Sanibel" were recorded at Conway Recording Studios in Hollywood. "Heartland" was recorded at Ocean Studios in Burbank, California. The remainder of the album was recorded at Neil Young's facility, Redwood Digital, in Woodside, California.

Reception
Looking Forward has sold approximately 370,000 copies in the United States. It received mixed critical reviews. In 2000, CSNY launched the CSNY2K Tour in support of the album, the quartet's first tour since the summer stadium tour of 1974.

Track listing

Personnel

CSNY 
 David Crosby – vocals, electric guitar (3), acoustic guitar (7)
 Stephen Stills – vocals, Hammond B3 organ (1), acoustic guitar (1, 2, 5, 8, 10), electric guitar (1, 3, 4, 7, 8, 11), bass guitar (1), batá drum (1), cowbell (1), cymbals (1), maracas (1, 8), timbales (1), double bass (8), percussion (11)
 Graham Nash – vocals, acoustic guitar (10)
 Neil Young – vocals, electric guitar (1, 3–5, 7, 8, 11), acoustic guitar (2, 9, 10), guitars (6), harmonica (6), tiple (9), celesta (11)

Additional personnel 
 Joe Vitale – additional Hammond B3 organ (1), batá drum (1), bateria (1), drums (3–5, 7, 8, 10–12)
 Spooner Oldham – pump organ (2), keyboards (6, 9)
 Mike Finnigan – Hammond B3 organ (3, 4, 8, 11)
 James Raymond – acoustic piano (4, 7)
 Craig Doerge – keyboards (12)
 Ben Keith – Dobro (2), pedal steel guitar (2, 6, 9) 
 Snuffy Garrett – guitars (12)
 Denny Sarokin – guitars (12)
 Donald Dunn – bass (2, 3, 5, 6, 9–11)
 Gerald Johnson – bass (4)
 James "Hutch" Hutchinson – bass (7)
 Bob Glaub – bass (12)
 Jim Keltner – drums (2, 6, 9)
 Luis Conte – bass drum (1), batá drum (1), congas (1), percussion (7)
 Alex Acuña – additional timbales (1)
 Joe Lala – additional congas (1)
 Lenny Castro – percussion (4)
 Vince Charles – percussion (12)

Production personnel 
 Crosby, Stills, Nash & Young – producers (all tracks), mixing 
 Joe Vitale – producer (1, 8, 12), engineer (1, 8)
 Ben Keith – producer (2, 6, 9)
 Stanley Johnston – producer (12), engineer (12)
 Stephen Stills – engineer (1, 8)
 Ed Cherney – live drum engineer (1, 8)
 Tim Mulligan – engineer (2, 6, 9–11), digital mastering 
 Bill Halverson – engineer (3, 5, 7), mixing
 Robi Banerji – engineer (4)
 Paul Dieter – engineer (4)
 Aaron Lepley – second live drum engineer (1, 8)
 John Hausmann – second engineer (2, 6, 9–11)
 Tony Flores – second engineer (3, 5, 7)
 Barry Goldberg – second engineer (3, 5, 7)
 Lior Goldenberg – second engineer (3, 5, 7)
 Robert Breen – second engineer (4)
 DeVal Day – second engineer (4)
 Jim Mitchell – second engineer (12)
 John Nowland – analog/HDCD engineer 
 Nathaniel Kunkel – additional engineer 
 Keith Woods – tape archivist 
 Gary Burden – art direction, design, inlay typography, management 
 Jenice Heo – art direction, design, typography
 Henry Diltz – band photography 
 Pegi Young – front cover photography 
 R. Mac Holbert – outside folder band photo imaging
 Frank Gironda – management
 Gerry Tolman – management

Charts

References

Crosby, Stills, Nash & Young albums
1999 albums
Reprise Records albums
Albums produced by Neil Young
Albums produced by Ben Keith
Albums produced by Graham Nash
Albums produced by David Crosby
Albums produced by Stephen Stills
Albums produced by Joe Vitale (musician)